2004 in film is an overview of events, including the highest-grossing films, award ceremonies, festivals, a list of country-specific lists of films released, notable deaths and film debuts. Shrek 2 was the year's top-grossing film, and Million Dollar Baby won the Academy Award for Best Picture.

Evaluation of the year
Renowned American film critic and professor Emanuel Levy described 2004 as "a banner year for actors, particularly men." He went on to emphasize, "I can't think of another year in which there were so many good performances, in every genre. It was a year in which we saw the entire spectrum of demographics displayed on the big screen, from vet actors such as Clint Eastwood and Morgan Freeman, to seniors such as Pacino, De Niro, and Hoffman, to newcomers such as Topher Grace. As always, though, the center of the male acting pyramid is occupied by actors in their forties and fifties, such as Sean Penn, Johnny Depp, Liam Neeson, Kevin Kline, Don Cheadle, Jim Carrey. In terms of film genres, Levy stated, "The year's most prominent genre was the biopicture, a genre that in the past has suffered from lack of prestige and abundance of clichés. There were a dozen worthy biopictures, including Alexander, The Aviator, Beyond the Sea, Finding Neverland, Hotel Rwanda, Kinsey, Motorcycle Diaries, and Ray. Celebrating entrepreneurs, playwrights, singers, sex researchers, composers, and politicians, they continued to show one alarming bias: They were all about men. You don't have to be a feminist critic or a sociologist to deduct that, as far as real or reel heroes are concerned, women matter less in Hollywood and American society at large. Can't anyone come up with a strong part for a femme-driven bio a la British film Vera Drake, without relegating women to showbiz personae." Levy also stated, "Classic Hollywood cinema, which reached its height during the golden age of studio system and has been in decline, is kept alive by one major force: Clint Eastwood. The "Man With No Name" has become the "Man With the Best Name", a director who's experiencing an unparallel artistic height with “Million Dollar Baby,” a follow-up to the equally sublime Mystic River."

Highest-grossing films

The top 10 films released in 2004 by worldwide gross are as follows:

Shrek 2 set a new record for total gross by an animated film making it the highest-grossing animated film of all time. The record was later surpassed by Toy Story 3 in 2010. On July 7, Spider-Man 2 reached a $200 million domestic gross in a record time of eight days. On July 18, after 19 days in release, Spider-Man 2 reached $300 million domestically in another record time. Harry Potter and the Prisoner of Azkaban has the highest international revenue of $546 million compared to Shrek 2s $487.5 million.

The Passion of the Christ, directed by Mel Gibson, became the first blockbuster motion picture of 2004 and also the highest grossing R-rated film domestically. Meet the Fockers beat 2003's Bruce Almighty record for the highest-grossing comedy film; both were released by Universal.

Events

Awards

Palme d'Or (Cannes Film Festival)
Fahrenheit 9/11, directed by Michael Moore, United States
Golden Lion (Venice Film Festival)
Vera Drake, directed by Mike Leigh, United Kingdom
Golden Bear (Berlin Film Festival)
Head-On, directed by Fatih Akın, Germany & Turkey

2004 films 
The list of films released in 2004, arranged by country, are as follows:
 List of American films of 2004
 List of Argentine films of 2004
 List of Australian films of 2004
 List of Bangladeshi films of 2004
 List of Brazilian films of 2004
 List of British films of 2004
 List of Chinese films of 2004
 List of Hong Kong films of 2004
 List of French films of 2004
 List of Indian films of 2004
List of Bengali films of 2004
 List of Bollywood films of 2004
 List of Kannada films of 2004
 List of Tamil films of 2004
 List of Telugu films of 2004
List of Malayalam films of 2004
 List of Italian films of 2004
 List of Japanese films of 2004
 List of Mexican films of 2004
 List of Pakistani films of 2004
 List of Russian films of 2004
 List of South Korean films of 2004
 List of Spanish films of 2004

Births
 January 10 - Kaitlyn Maher, American singer and actress
 January 16 – Harry Collett, English actor
 January 25 - Rohan Chand, American actor
 February 19 – Millie Bobby Brown, English actress and producer
 March 5 - Kit Connor, English actor
 April 23 - Teagan Croft, Australian actress
 May 13 – Ava Acres, American actress
 May 22 - Peyton Elizabeth Lee, American actress
 June 19 - Louis Ashbourne Serkis, English actor
 July 2 - Caitlin Carmichael, American actress
 July 6 - Dylan Kingwell, Canadian actor
 July 16
Ruby Barnhill, English actress
Amiah Miller, American actress
 August 19 - Siena Agudong, American actress
 September 10 – Gabriel Bateman, American actor
 September 12 - Ellis Rubin (actor), American actor
 September 23 - Anthony Gonzalez (actor), American actor
 October 3 - Noah Schnapp, American actor
 October 10 - Zain Al Rafeea, Syrian-born Norwegian actor
 November 1 - Jayden Bartels, American YouTuber, singer and actress
 November 11 – Oakes Fegley, American actor
 November 16 - Marlon Kazadi, Canadian actor
 November 27 - Jet Jurgensmeyer, American actor
 December 5 - Jules LeBlanc, American YouTuber, singer and actress
 December 9 - Nico Parker, English actress
 December 30 - Lyliana Wray, American actress

Deaths

Film debuts 
Emily Blunt – My Summer of Love
Eddie Cahill – Miracle
Josh Duhamel – The Picture of Dorian Gray
Will Forte – Around the World in 80 Days
Megan Fox – Confessions of a Teenage Drama Queen
Rupert Friend – The Libertine
Nick Frost – Shaun of the Dead
David Harbour – Kinsey
Amber Heard – Friday Night Lights
Jon Heder – Napoleon Dynamite
Ed Helms – Blackballed: The Bobby Dukes Story
Jonah Hill – I Heart Huckabees
Cheryl Hines – Along Came Polly
Toby Kebbell – Dead Man's Shoes
Joel McHale – Spider-Man 2
Chris Pine – The Princess Diaries 2: Royal Engagement
Amanda Seyfried – Mean Girls
Olivia Wilde – The Girl Next Door
Patrick Wilson – The Alamo

References 

 
Film by year
2004-related lists
Mass media timelines by year